The Italian cheese Bra originates from the town of Bra in Province of Cuneo, in the region of Piemonte.

Production of Bra may take place all year, but it may only legally take place within the province of Cuneo. However, aging may also take place in Villafranca, in Province of Turin.

The cheese may use either unpasteurized or pasteurized milk, often entirely cow's milk, but goat's or sheep's milk may be added in small amounts. It may be served as a soft or hard cheese, depending on the length of aging, from at least 45 days for soft cheese, to six months for hard cheese.

Bra has PDO status under European Law.

References
 Formaggio.it - Bra (Italian) (accessed 2 January 2008)
 Cheese.com - Bra (accessed 2 January 2008)
 Rubino, R., Sardo, P., Surrusca, A. (eds.),  'Italian Cheese: 293 Traditional Types' , 

Piedmontese cheeses
Italian cheeses
Italian products with protected designation of origin
Province of Cuneo
Cow's-milk cheeses
Cheeses with designation of origin protected in the European Union